Bradham is a surname. Notable people with the surname include:
Caleb Bradham (1867–1934), pharmacist who invented Pepsi
Nigel Bradham (born 1989), football linebacker

See also
Slover-Bradham House